The Bernoulli Box (or simply Bernoulli, named after Daniel Bernoulli) is a high-capacity (for the time) removable floppy disk storage system that is Iomega's first widely known product. It was released in 1982.

Overview
The drive spins a PET film floppy disk at about 3000 rpm, 1 μm over a read-write head, using Bernoulli's principle to pull the flexible disk towards the head as long as the disk is spinning. In theory this makes the Bernoulli drive more reliable than a contemporary hard disk drive, since a head crash is impossible.

The original Bernoulli disks came in capacities of 5, 10, and 20 MB. They are roughly 21 cm by 27.5 cm, similar to the size of a sheet of A4 paper.

The most popular system was the Bernoulli Box II, whose disk cases are 13.6 cm wide, 14 cm long and 0.9 cm thick, somewhat resembling a 3 -inch standard floppy disk but in 5 -inch form factor. Bernoulli Box II disks came in the following capacities: 20 MB, 35 MB, 44 MB, 65 MB, 90 MB (late 1980s), 105 MB, 150 MB, and in 1993, 230 MB. There are five types of drives, grouped by the maximum readable capacity: 20 MB, 44 MB, 90 MB, 150 MB, and 230 MB. The interface is usually SCSI. Drives were available as either internal units, which fit into standard 5 -inch drive bays, or as external units with one or two drives in a self-contained case connected to the host computer via external SCSI connector. The disks have a physical switch similar to that on 3 -inch standard floppy disks to enable and disable write protection.

Reception
PC Magazine in 1984 stated that the Bernoulli Box "... combines the advantages of [standard] floppy- and hard-disk systems without their drawbacks." It reported no software-compatibility problems and cited the box's durable design. Bruce Webster of BYTE wrote favorably of the peripheral in February 1986, reporting that "I have not had a single glitch or lost file" in nine months of constant use.

Successors
Iomega's later removable-storage products such as the Zip floppy disk and Jaz and Rev removable hard disks do not use the Bernoulli technology.

References

External links

Floppy disk drives
Iomega storage devices
Discontinued media formats
Computer-related introductions in 1982